Valencia ElPozo Fútbol Sala is a futsal club based in Valencia, city of the province of Valencia in the autonomous community of Valencian Community.

The club was founded in 1983 and her arena is Pabellón San Isidro with capacity of 500 seaters.
The team was known between 1991 and 2004 as Valencia Vijusa.
Note: - The team was forced to be relegated to Division de Plata, after of that the principal sponsor, Promociones Armiñana, leave the club.

Trophies
División de Honor: 0
Runners-up: 2000–01
Supercopa de España: 0
Runners-up: 2002–03
Copa de España (ACEFS): 2
Winners: 1982–83, 1983–84
Copa de España (LNFS): 1
Winners: 2001–02
Quarterfinals: 2000–01

Season to season

10 seasons in División de Honor
5 seasons in División de Plata
7 seasons in Segunda División B
3 seasons in Tercera División

Notable former players
 Leandro Simi
 Kike Bonet
 Rafa

External links
Valencia FS official website

Futsal clubs in Spain
Sports teams in the Valencian Community
Futsal clubs established in 1983
1983 establishments in Spain
Sport in Valencia